Brij Mohan Birla ( 1904 - 1981 ) was one of the scions of Birla family and a noted Industrialist and philanthropist.  He was the youngest and 4th son of Ghanshyam Das Birla. He served as Chairman of Hindustan Motors, Ruby General Insurance, India Exchange Ltd, NBC Bearing and was on board of several other Birla companies. He founded Hindustan Motors in 1942 and NBC Bearings in 1946. CK Birla Group is successor to his branch of Birla family. He served as president of Indian Chamber of Commerce in 1936 and the Federation of Indian Chambers of Commerce & Industry for year 1954.

He was a philanthropist and there are many institutions which own its existence due to donations by him and his trusts:-

Birla Institute of Technology, Mesra near Ranchi was established in the year 1955 him 
Birla Mandir, Jaipur
B. M. Birla Planetarium, Chennai
B. M. Birla Science Museum, Hyderabad
B. M. Birla Heart Research Centre, Kolkata is named after him
Modern High School for Girls, Kolkata was founded by him in 1952
Rani Birla Girls' College, Kolkata founded in 1961
Modern High School for Girls, Pilani
Rukmani Birla High School, Jaipur, named after wife of Brij Mohan Birla
B.M. Birla Science and Technology Centre , Jaipur .

References

1904 births
1981 deaths
Indian industrialists
Birla family
Indian philanthropists
Founders of Indian schools and colleges
Indian founders of automobile manufacturers
People from Kolkata